Sunshine Follows Rain or Rain Follows the Dew (Swedish: Driver dagg faller regn) is a 1943 Swedish historical novel by Margit Söderholm.

In 1946 it was adapted into a film Sunshine Follows Rain directed by Gustaf Edgren and starring Mai Zetterling and Alf Kjellin.

References

Bibliography
 Goble, Alan. The Complete Index to Literary Sources in Film. Walter de Gruyter, 1999.
 Gaster, Adrian. The International Authors and Writers Who's Who. International Biographical Centre, 1977.

1943 Swedish novels
Swedish novels adapted into films
Swedish historical novels
Novels by Margit Söderholm
Novels set in the 19th century